Emilia Entcheva is a Bulgarian–American engineer who is a professor of biomedical engineering at George Washington University. She serves as Director of the Cardiac Optogenetics and Optical Imaging Laboratory. She is a Fellow of the American Institute for Medical and Biological Engineering.

Early life and education 
Entcheva studied electrical engineering at the Technical University, Sofia. She moved to the United States for graduate studies, joining the University of Memphis for a doctorate in simulations of cardiac tissue. Specifically, her work looked to understand structure-property relationships in the heart.

Research and career 
In the early 2000s, Entcheva started her research group at Stony Brook University. She worked on systems biology and computational strategies that can describe complex biological processes. In 2007, she started working on optogenetics: a strategy to control neuronal activity using light.

Entcheva moved to the Department of Biomedical Engineering at George Washington University in 2016. She has developed opto-epigenetic controls for human heart cells and all-optical approaches for electrophysiology. Her research combines biophotonics with clinical science and gene engineering to advance personal medicine. Entcheva is interested in new therapeutics for oncology and cardiology. She has worked to uncover the action of dynamic chromatin modifiers in heart cells with the hope to identify more effective therapeutics. To achieve dynamic control she leverages the action of histone deacetylase inhibitors, photoswitchable small molecules known to modify light, and patterned light.

In 2016, Entcheva was inducted into the American Institute for Medical and Biological Engineering.

Selected publications

References 

Living people
University of Memphis alumni
Technical University, Sofia alumni
Bulgarian emigrants to the United States
American women engineers
Biomedical engineers
20th-century American engineers
21st-century American engineers
George Washington University faculty
Fellows of the American Institute for Medical and Biological Engineering
20th-century American women scientists
21st-century American women scientists
20th-century women engineers
21st-century women engineers
Year of birth missing (living people)